Mercenaria is a genus of edible saltwater clams, marine bivalve molluscs in the family Veneridae, the Venus clams.

The genus Mercenaria includes the quahogs, consisting of Mercenaria mercenaria, the northern quahog or hard clam, and M. campechiensis, the southern quahog. These two species commonly hybridise where their ranges overlap.

Mercenaria mercenaria is further subdivided in the marketplace and thence in the kitchen by size: the largest being the quahog or chowder clam, then smaller cherrystones, and smallest littlenecks; some markets also differentiate top necks which are intermediate in size between cherrystones and littlenecks. The smaller clams are eaten raw throughout New England, New York, and New Jersey; the larger clams are more suited for cooking.

Other species within the genus include the venus clam M. stimpsoni found in north Pacific waters. All these species were formerly placed in the related genus Venus.

Species
The World Register of Marine Species accepts the following extant species as valid: 
 Mercenaria campechiensis (Gmelin, 1791) – Southern quahog
 Mercenaria mercenaria (Linnaeus, 1758) – Northern quahog
 Mercenaria stimpsoni (Gould, 1861) – Venus clam
 Mercenaria texana (Dall, 1902)

Fossils species
Several other species are known only from fossils. These mollusk lived from Oligocene to Quaternary (from 23.03 to 0.0 Ma). Fossil shells have been found in the sediments of Russia, Japan, Indonesia, United States and Brazil.

†Mercenaria blakei Ward 1992
†Mercenaria campechiensis Gmelin, 1791
†Mercenaria campechiensis carolinensis Conrad 1875
†Mercenaria campechiensis rileyi Conrad 1838
†Mercenaria campechiensis tridacnoides Lamarck 1818
 †Mercenaria capax Conrad 1843
 †Mercenaria cuneata Conrad 1869
 †Mercenaria druidi Ward 1992
 †Mercenaria ducatelli Conrad 1838
 †Mercenaria erecta Kellum 1926
 †Mercenaria gardnerae Kellum 1926
 †Mercenaria langdoni Dall 1900
 †Mercenaria nannodes Gardner 1947
 †Mercenaria permagna Conrad 1838
 †Mercenaria plena Conrad 1869
†Mercenaria plena inflata Dall 1903
†Mercenaria plena nucea Dall 1903
 †Mercenaria prodroma Gardner 1947
 †Mercenaria tetrica Conrad 1838

Bibliography
 W. S. Arnold, T. M. Bert, D. C. Marelli, H. Cruz-Lopez, P. A. Gill Genotype-specific growth of hard clams (genus Mercenaria) in a hybrid zone: variation among habitats
 John Norman Kraeuter, Michael Castagna Biology of the Hard Clam

References

Veneridae
Extant Oligocene first appearances
Bivalve genera